A landing footprint, also called a landing ellipse, is the area of uncertainty of a spacecraft's landing zone on an astronomical body. After atmospheric entry, a non-powered spacecraft will land in an area depending upon entry angle, entry mass, atmosphere and drag. It is therefore impossible to know the spacecraft's landing point with absolute precision. By simulating varying reentry courses, a numerical simulation will produce a plot resembling a footprint. The footprint size depends on the confidence interval used to develop the map.

References

Further reading
 

Spaceflight concepts